Johann Philipp Cardinal Count von Lamberg (25 May 1651 in Vienna - 30 October 1712 in Regensburg), was bishop of Passau, a Cardinal and diplomat in the service of the Habsburg emperors.

Early life 
Originating from the old Austrian aristocracy, born into the House of Lamberg, he was son of Count Johann Maximilian von Lamberg-Steyr (1608-1682) (reputable diplomat who was a member of the delegation of the Holy Roman Empire when negotiating the Westphalian Peace) and his wife Countess Judith Rebecca Eleonore von Wrbna und Freudenthal (1612-1690).

Biography 
Johann Philipp studied philosophy, law, and political science in Vienna, Steyr, and Passau. In 1663 he became a canon in Passau, in 1668 in Olomouc, and in 1673 Doctor iuris utriusque at the University of Siena. In 1675, he was succeeded by his appointment as mayor in Salzburg and in 1676 as imperial court councilor. As such, he was ambassador in Düsseldorf, Dresden, Berlin and Regensburg. Lamberg also participated in the Great Turkish War. On 24 May 1689 the cathedral chapter of Passau elected him to be the new bishop, although he had received the deacon ordination. On 11 January 1690 the papal confirmation followed, and on 14 May 1690 the bishop's ordination by the Archbishop of Kalocsa, Leopold Karl von Kollonitsch.

Johann Philipp von Lamberg also remained as a prince-bishop mainly a politician and diplomat. In 1697 he went as an imperial emissary to Warsaw, where he helped to arrange the election of Duke Augustus of Saxony as the king of Poland–Lithuania. In 1699 he was appointed Imperial Principal Commissar, and on 21 July 1700, at the suggestion of Emperor Leopold I, his appointment as Cardinal priest was followed by Pope Innocent XII. His titular church was San Silvestro in Capite. He took part in conclave 1700, in which Clement XI was elected as Pope.

At the outbreak of the War of the Spanish succession of succession, in 1702, he succeeded in the Reichstag in Regensburg by declaring the war against France and the Reichsacht (imperial ban) against Elector Max Emanuel of Bavaria and his brother, Elector Joseph Clemens of Cologne. Also during the election of emperors Joseph I and Charles VI was diplomatically active.

Legacy
Under his aegis the completion of the Cathedral of St. Stephen was completed in Passau and the construction of the New Residence Palace (Neue Residenz) began. He moved the clerical seminar from the Passau Jesuit College in 1694 to the building of today's state library. Finally, at the cathedral crossroads he built his own burial site, now named the Lamberg Chapel (Lamberg-Kapelle).

Some traces of his activities also can be found outside of Passau: in the trade routes belonging to the so-called Goldener Steig ("Golden Trail"), he founded several new villages, of which Philippsreut still bears its name.

References

1651 births
1712 deaths
Roman Catholic bishops of Passau
Diplomats from Vienna
Clergy from Vienna